Chase Field Industrial Complex , formerly Naval Air Station Chase Field, is a former naval air station located in unincorporated Bee County, Texas, near Beeville, Texas. The Texas Department of Criminal Justice operates a group of facilities collectively referred to as the Chase Field Criminal Justice Center on the grounds of the former air station.

The TDCJ facilities include the Correctional Institutions Division Region IV Office, two transfer facilities (Garza East Unit and Garza West Unit), and the Beeville Distribution Center.

References

External links

 "About BDA." Bee Development Authority - A page that talks about Chase Field

Buildings and structures in Bee County, Texas